Tragocephala carbonaria is a species of beetle in the family Cerambycidae. It was described by Lameere in 1892.

References

carbonaria
Beetles described in 1892